Kozeletsky Uyezd (Козелецкий уезд) was one of the subdivisions of the Chernigov Governorate of the Russian Empire. It was situated in the southwestern part of the governorate. Its administrative centre was Kozelets.

Demographics
At the time of the Russian Empire Census of 1897, Kozeletsky Uyezd had a population of 135,129. Of these, 95.2% spoke Ukrainian, 3.5% Yiddish, 1.0% Russian and 0.1% Polish as their native language.

References

 
Uyezds of Chernigov Governorate
Chernigov Governorate